Gianluigi Nuzzi (born 3 June 1969) is an Italian journalist, writer, and television host. He is the author of His Holiness: The Secret Papers of Benedict XVI. He considers himself Roman Catholic.

References

External links 
 Vatileaks-Prozess: Reportern droht Haftstrafe wegen Hochverrats 

1969 births
Italian television journalists
Living people
Italian male writers
Italian Roman Catholics